Orlando Merlini (died 1510) was an Italian painter of the Renaissance, active in Gubbio in Umbria.

Biography
He was a follower of the style of Sinibaldo Ibi. His son, Ventura Merlino, was also a painter in Gubbio.

External links

16th-century Italian painters
Italian male painters
Umbrian painters
Italian Renaissance painters
1510 deaths
Year of birth missing